Howdilly Doodilly is the first studio album by Phoenix-based, Ned Flanders-themed metalcore band Okilly Dokilly, released on November 11, 2016. According to the band, the lyrics contain "75% Ned quotes and 25% other characters/original." The album was recorded and mixed by Jalipaz Nelson at Audioconfusion in Mesa, Arizona in early 2016.

The single "White Wine Spritzer" was released prior to the album on October 30, 2016, with a music video on November 6.

Track listing

Personnel
Head Ned – vocals, screams, guitars, bass, mandolin, percussion
Red Ned – synth, vocals
Stead Ned – guitars
Thread Ned – bass
Bled Ned – drums

References

2016 debut albums
Okilly Dokilly albums